Eduard Vassilievich Malofeyev (Eduard Malafyeyew; born 2 June 1942 in Kolomna) is a Soviet and Belarusian football coach and former international player of Russian origin.

Despite being born and grown in Russian SFSR, Malofeyev rose to prominence in Belarus, having scored over 100 goals in Soviet Top League for Dinamo Minsk. He led Dinamo Minsk to the team's only Soviet champions title, and coached Belarus national football team.

Life and career 

Malofeyev played for Avangard Kolomna (1960), Spartak Moscow (1961–1962) and Dinamo Minsk (1963–1972). In 1962, he won the Soviet championship with Spartak.

He was capped 40 times for the USSR national team in 1963–1968 and scored 6 goals. He participated in UEFA Euro 1964 and 1968 as well World Cup 1966

As a coach, Malofeyev led Dinamo Minsk to the championship in the Soviet Top League in 1982. In 1984–1986 he was the head coach for USSR. The national team qualified for the 1986 World Cup but he was fired shortly before the World Cup started in favor of Valeri Lobanovsky. He also coached the Belarus national football team from 2000 to 2003.

Between 2004 and 2007 he worked in all three clubs associated with Vladimir Romanov's holding (Belarusian MTZ-RIPO Minsk, Lithuanian FBK Kaunas and Scottish Hearts) at various coaching and administrative positions.

In later years he had coached Dynamo St. Petersburg (whom he led to promotion to the Russian First Division in 2009), Shakhtyor Soligorsk and Pskov-747.

References

External links 
 Profile at RussiaTeam 

1942 births
Living people
People from Kolomna
Soviet footballers
Belarusian footballers
Association football forwards
Soviet Union international footballers
1964 European Nations' Cup players
1966 FIFA World Cup players
UEFA Euro 1968 players
Soviet Top League players
FC Spartak Moscow players
FC Dinamo Minsk players
Belarusian expatriate sportspeople in the United Kingdom
Belarusian expatriate sportspeople in Lithuania
Soviet football managers
Belarusian football managers
Higher School of Coaches alumni
Belarusian expatriate football managers
Expatriate football managers in Russia
Expatriate football managers in Scotland
Expatriate football managers in Lithuania
Russian Premier League managers
Scottish Premier League managers
FC Dynamo Brest managers
FC Dinamo Minsk managers
Soviet Union national football team managers
FC Dynamo Moscow managers
FC Tyumen managers
FC Smena Minsk managers
FC Anzhi Makhachkala managers
FC Pskov-2000 managers
Belarus national football team managers
FC Fakel Voronezh managers
FBK Kaunas managers
Heart of Midlothian F.C. managers
FC Partizan Minsk managers
FC Dynamo Saint Petersburg managers
FC Shakhtyor Soligorsk managers
Sportspeople from Moscow Oblast